CompuAdd Corporation was a manufacturer of personal computers in Austin, Texas. It assembled its product from components manufactured by others. CompuAdd created generic PC clone computers, but unlike most clone makers, it had a large engineering staff. CompuAdd also created a Multimedia PC (MPC), the FunStation, and a Sun workstation clone, the SS-1.

CompuAdd was the largest clone PC manufacturer in Austin until 1993 and outsold PC's Limited (now Dell Computer Corporation). CompuAdd sold PCs to corporate, educational and government entities. CompuAdd Computers 386 was on the US Army's Mobile Missile System in Gulf War 1 (1991) and it was rated and tested by the Army for that use.

History

Background
Bill Hayden was born in San Antonio, Texas. He went to school at the University of Texas at Austin and graduated with a degree in electrical engineering in 1971. He was employed by Texas Instruments as a design engineer in a classified government reconnaissance project. In 1974, he switched to TI's Calculator Division and became a project engineer. It was there that Hayden claims he developed the entrepreneurial spirit that he later applied when he started CompuAdd.

After several years in this position, which required a great deal of overtime, he decided that he needed more time to contemplate his future. He noticed that quality assurance was less demanding work with shorter hours and switched to that. As his 10-year anniversary with TI approached in 1981, Hayden turned in his resignation.

CompuAdd was always 2nd fiddle to across town rival Dell Computer. Hayden's desire to have better name recognition and his own engineering staff stretched his company too far in debt. Retail stores, engineering development cost overruns, and creation of CompuLite instead of cutting costs in his core business, all led to the company's demise.

Hayden tried several other business ventures that were unsuccessful.

Products and retail stores

CompuAdd was founded by Bill Hayden in the following year, 1982. CompuAdd using $100,000 earned by selling real estate part-time. Hayden sold computer peripherals and add-on devices such as disk drives. The name came from this computer add-on business plan. 

The company's marketing slogan was: Customer Driven, by Design, and it prided itself on its "no frills" corporate culture.

CompuAdd operated a chain of retail computer stores in the United States. They also had a strong server line.  At the height of CompuAdd's reign, it had over 100 sales people. In 1992, Hayden split the company into two parts: "one to handle 125 retail outlets and international markets" and the other for "large business and government accounts."

Bankruptcy and acquisition
In 1993, CompuAdd closed all of its 110 retail stores, to concentrate on direct sales, and sought Chapter 11 bankruptcy protection – but also launched a new line of Centura personal computers. When they emerged from bankruptcy in November 1993, 75 percent ownership of the company was transferred to unsecured creditors, with Hayden retaining 20 percent and the remainder held for employees.

Hayden shortly afterwards resigned as CEO, a position taken over by Richard Krause, the company's president and chief operating officer. CompuAdd was subsequently bought by Dimeling, Schrieber & Park, a private Philadelphia investment company in September 1994.

References

External links

CompuAdd corporate information and history at Fundinguniverse.com

1982 establishments in Texas
1994 disestablishments in Texas
1994 mergers and acquisitions
American companies established in 1982
American companies disestablished in 1994
Companies that filed for Chapter 11 bankruptcy in 1993
Computer companies established in 1982
Computer companies disestablished in 1994
Defunct computer companies of the United States
Defunct computer hardware companies
Manufacturing companies based in Austin, Texas
Texas Instruments spinoffs